Kemel Thompson (born September 25, 1974) is a former Jamaican athlete who competes in the 400 metres hurdles.

His personal best time is 48.05 seconds, achieved in London in 2003.

Kemel competed for the University of South Florida from 1992–1996 and graduated from Loughborough University's Business School in 2003. He was a member of the Jamaican Olympic Team at the 2000 and 2004 Summer Olympics.

Achievements

External links
 

1974 births
Living people
Jamaican male hurdlers
Olympic athletes of Jamaica
Athletes (track and field) at the 2000 Summer Olympics
Athletes (track and field) at the 2004 Summer Olympics
Athletes (track and field) at the 1998 Commonwealth Games
Athletes (track and field) at the 2006 Commonwealth Games
Alumni of Loughborough University
Commonwealth Games bronze medallists for Jamaica
Commonwealth Games medallists in athletics
Central American and Caribbean Games bronze medalists for Jamaica
Competitors at the 1998 Central American and Caribbean Games
World Athletics Indoor Championships winners
Central American and Caribbean Games medalists in athletics
South Florida Bulls men's track and field athletes
University of South Florida olympians
University of South Florida alumni
20th-century Jamaican people
21st-century Jamaican people
Medallists at the 2006 Commonwealth Games